Mohammad Avaz (also Romanized as Moḩammad ‘Avaẕ; also known as Moḩammadābād and Moḩammadābād-e ‘Avaẕ) is a village in Shirin Su Rural District, Maneh District, Maneh and Samalqan County, North Khorasan Province, Iran. At the 2006 census, its population was 77, in 13 families.

References 

Populated places in Maneh and Samalqan County